Sweet Fuse: At Your Side, released in Japan as , is an otome game visual novel for the PlayStation Portable. The game can also be played on the PlayStation Vita by being downloaded from the PlayStation Store. It was released in the PAL region and North America in August 2013 by Aksys Games.

Gameplay
Sweet Fuse is a mystery and romance visual novel in which the player assumes the role of Saki Inafune, as she plays through seven days of death games. Much of its gameplay is spent on reading the story's narrative and dialogue. The player will be prompted on occasion to pick what to make Saki say. Picking the correct responses will sometimes given the player an "affection point" for a particular character which raises that character's affection level. There are moments during which Saki will become irate, indicated by the screen shaking and turning red, and the player will have to choose between having her restrain her anger or letting it out.

"Explosive Insight" sections take place when Saki must find a solution or an answer to a problem. Saki recalls the situation to herself, with a number of keywords and phrases in her thoughts highlighted. The player can pick up to three highlighted words or phrases to select, and the player prompts Saki's epiphany if one of their selections is correct. If the player does not select the correct phrases, a bad ending will usually occur and they are prompted to try again.

The game follows a branching plot line with multiple endings; depending on the decisions that the player makes during the game, the plot will progress in a specific direction.

Characters

 The protagonist, who is a high-school girl and niece to Keiji Inafune. Her first and last name can be changed by the player. She has excellent intuition, making her great at spotting lies.

 A police inspector who was in charge of security for the opening ceremony. He is calm, collected, and rational, although slightly uptight.

 A member of the famous pop group, Junior Jr. Boys. He is cheerful and energetic on stage, but when things go wrong he is easily scared.

 A gloomy, asocial shut-in obsessed with video games. He is an online legend nicknamed "Ares" by fellow gaming fans for his gaming prowess.

 A freelance journalist who always looks like he needs a good night's sleep. He is obsessed with the truth, and will do anything to get to it.

 A young fortune teller known as the "Oracle of Shinjuku". He has a calming and gentle disposition.

 An escort at a club called "Ulysses" in Ginza. Has a short fuse and is quick with his fists, but maintains a professional demeanor.

 An upbeat, friendly college student who was attacked by piglets right before the opening ceremony.

 The heroine's uncle, who is also well-known as a legendary video game designer. During the game, he is held hostage somewhere in the park.

 A mysterious person in a pig-suit who has taken over the park by taking the management hostage.

Reception

In other media
Serialization of a shōjo manga by Kyōnosuke Yamaguchi began in 2012 in Kadokawa Shoten's magazines Altima A, then Monthly Asuka. It was released as a tankōbon on February 21, 2013, under the imprint Asuka Comics DX.

References

External links
Sweet Fuse: At Your Side official English site
Bakudan Handan official Japanese site

2012 video games
PlayStation Portable games
PlayStation Portable-only games
Visual novels
Otome games
Video games developed in Japan
Video games featuring female protagonists
Idea Factory games
Single-player video games